Dos Torres is a city located in the province of Córdoba, Spain. According to the 2006 census (INE), the city has a population of 2592 inhabitants.

References

External links
Dos Torres - Sistema de Información Multiterritorial de Andalucía

Municipalities in the Province of Córdoba (Spain)